The Standard Austria was a single-seat aerobatic glider that was originally designed and built in Austria from 1959 but production was moved in 1962 to Schempp-Hirth in Germany.

Development 
Commissioned by the Österreichischer Aeroclub – (Austrian Aero club) the Standard Austria was designed by Rüdiger Kunz to compete in the 1960 OSTIV competition for a standard class sailplane, winning plaudits as the best standard class aircraft. The design aims were to produce an aircraft with a low wing loading and a high lift/drag ratio, which necessitated low weight and low drag. To achieve the design aims the Standard Austria was constructed primarily of wood with plywood skinning and a glass-fibre nose section, pilots seat and tail-cone. Other weight and drag saving measures included use of an all-moving 'V' or 'Butterfly' tail unit with two surfaces, set in a 'V' configuration, providing stability and control in both pitch and yaw, in exchange for increased cost and complexity of the control systems and minor handling side effects, like slight pitching of the aircraft with application of rudder and vice versa.

After the initial production run in Austria, production was moved to Schempp-Hirth in Germany, where the Standard Austria's development continued with improved and heavier models, optional retractable undercarriage, replacement of the NACA section wings with wings using an Eppler 266 section, to improve low-speed performance.

Two were used in the 1967 NFB film 'Flight' (CF-RNH, CF-RSO).

Variants 
Standard Austria
Initial production model built in Austria.
Standard Austria S
Production aircraft built by Schemp-Hirth under license in Germany.
Standard Austria SH
Improved heavier model, 5 built.
Standard Austria SH-I
The SH with retractable undercarriage
Standard Austria
From 1964 produced using an Eppler 266 aerofoil section.

The Schempp-Hirth SHK, a 17-meter Open Class glider, was also developed by Klaus Holighaus in 1965 from the SH-1.

Specifications (Standard Austria)

See also

References

 Taylor, J. H. (ed) (1989) Jane's Encyclopedia of Aviation. Studio Editions: London. p. 29
 Coates, Andrew. “Jane's World Sailplanes & Motor Gliders new edition”. London, Jane's. 1980.

External links

 https://web.archive.org/web/20150222043514/http://www.sailplanedirectory.com/schempp.htm
 Martin Schempp
https://web.archive.org/web/20070608193349/http://www.sailplanedirectory.com/PlaneDetails.cfm?planeID=338
British Gliding Association - Standard Austria data sheet

Schempp-Hirth aircraft
1950s Austrian sailplanes
V-tail aircraft
Aircraft first flown in 1959